Atomopteryx pterophoralis is a moth in the family Crambidae. It was described by Francis Walker in 1866. It is found in the Dominican Republic, Puerto Rico and Cuba.

References

Moths described in 1866
Spilomelinae
Moths of the Caribbean